Ramsey Forword (25 September 1925 – 21 March 2006) was a South African cricketer. He played in eight first-class matches for Eastern Province from 1952/53 and 1956/57.

See also
 List of Eastern Province representative cricketers

References

External links
 

1925 births
2006 deaths
South African cricketers
Eastern Province cricketers
People from Makhanda, Eastern Cape
Cricketers from the Eastern Cape